Oger Klos (born 19 August 1993 in Amsterdam) is a Dutch professional footballer who plays as a midfielder. He is currently without a club after having formerly played for AGOVV Apeldoorn and  Telstar.

External links
 Voetbal International profile 

1993 births
Living people
Dutch footballers
AGOVV Apeldoorn players
SC Telstar players
Eerste Divisie players
Footballers from Amsterdam
Association football midfielders